Man v. Food Nation is the name given to the fourth season of the Travel Channel's Man v. Food, a food reality television series. It premiered on June 1, 2011. A preview episode, "The Quest Begins", aired on May 25.

In this show, host Adam Richman travels to cities around the U.S. to try the signature food dishes of their local eateries. Unlike the previous three seasons of Man v. Food, where he himself took on a food challenge at a local restaurant, in this season, Richman recruits residents of the city he visits to take on a food challenge, while he serves as their coach by giving them tips and advice on how to beat their challenges, using the skills he learned previously from his own food challenges.

The final tally for the season was 11 wins for Man and 16 wins for Food. This was the first and only season to start (and end) with Food winning the challenge. It is also the only season in which Food scored more victories than Man.

With Richman announcing his retirement from competitive eating on January 27, 2012, Man v. Food Nation would be his final season of Man v. Food. On April 11 (after a four month hiatus), episodes filmed in Charlotte, North Carolina and Jackson, Mississippi, were aired, marking what was then the official close of the series.

In May 2017, Travel Channel announced the series revival, with Casey Webb replacing Richman as host. The fifth season premiered on August 7 the same year.

Episodes

References

External links
 Man v. Food Nation official website

2011 American television seasons
Man v. Food